The 1926 United States Senate special election in Indiana was held on November 2, 1926, to complete the unexpired term of Senator Samuel M. Ralston, who died on October 14, 1925. Interim Republican Senator Arthur Raymond Robinson, who had been appointed to fill the seat,  was re-elected to finish the term over Democrat Evans Woollen.

Background
In October 1925, incumbent Senator Samuel Ralston died in office. Governor Edward L. Jackson appointed Arthur Raymond Robinson to fill the seat until a successor could be duly elected, with the election scheduled for November 2, 1926. The winner would finish Ralston's term ending in 1929.

General election

Candidates
William O. Fogleson (Socialist)
Arthur Raymond Robinson, interim appointee Senator (Republican)
Albert Stanley (Prohibition)
Evans Woollen, banker, former football coach, and candidate for U.S. Representative in 1896 (Democratic)

Results

See also 
 1926 United States Senate elections

References

1926
Indiana
United States Senate
Indiana 1926
Indiana 1926
United States Senate 1926